Assin Manso is a town in the Central Region of Ghana. It is located 40 kilometers along the Cape Coast - Kumasi highway. The town is well known for the role it played as a slave market during the slave trade. It is also known for the Assin Manso Secondary School.  The school is a second cycle institution.

References

Populated places in the Central Region (Ghana)